Ego Is Not a Dirty Word is the second studio album released by Australian rock band, Skyhooks, in July 1975. The album was the follow-up to their highly successful debut album, Living in the 70's (1974). As with the former album, it was also produced by Ross Wilson.

The album spent 11 weeks at the number-one spot in the Australian Kent Music Report Albums Chart and sold over 200,000 copies. Two singles were lifted from the album, "Ego Is Not a Dirty Word" and "All My Friends are Getting Married".

The American release of the album contained "Horror Movie" and "You Just Like Me 'Cause I'm Good in Bed" from their first album in place of tracks 9 and 10. The album was re-released by Mushroom Records in 1997.

At the Australian 1975 King of Pop Awards the album won Most Popular Australian Album. At the 1975 Australian Record Awards, the album won Group Album of the Year.

Track listing

Charts

Weekly charts

Year-end charts

Certifications

Personnel
Skyhooks
Shirley Strachan – lead vocals
Red Symons – guitar, backing vocals
Bob "Bongo" Starkie – guitar, backing vocals
 Greg Macainsh – bass guitar, backing vocals
Imants Alfred Strauks – drums, percussion, backing vocals

Additional musicians
 Ross Wilson (as Duke Wilson) - producer
 Peter Jones – Fender Rhodes piano (tracks 2,8), marimba and vibes (1), chimes (3), boobams (4)
 Greg Sneddon – Arp synthesiser (10)
Andy Cowan Mini Moog (10)
 Col Loughnan – tenor and baritone saxophones (6)
 Pat Wilson – finger cymbals (1)
 Ross Wilson – Yamaha synthesiser (1), vocal harmonies
 Ian Mason – harmony vocals (8)
 Jenny Keath – harmony vocals (1)

References

External links
 

1975 albums
Skyhooks (band) albums
Glam rock albums by Australian artists
Mushroom Records albums